Liebeslieder Polkas is an album of the music of Peter Schickele under his comic pseudonym of P. D. Q. Bach. It describes itself as "the first opus of P.D.Q. Bach to be discovered in which he inflicted his music on the work of well-known poets, or even known poets, for that matter" and includes "the ambitious zodiac song cycle, the Twelve Quite Heavenly Songs". The album was released on Vanguard Records in 1980, with a cover image of Schickele mimicking a famous image of Johannes Brahms at the piano.

Performers
 Professor Peter Schickele, basso blotto, piano (fifth hand)
 The Swarthmore College Chorus, Peter Gram Swing, conductor
 John Ferrante, bargain counter tenor
 David Oei, piano, calliope, harpsichord, push-button chord organ
 Anne Epperson, piano

Track listing 
Liebeslieder Polkas for Mixed Chorus and Piano Five Hands, S. 2/4
 "To His Coy Mistress" (Andrew Marvell)
 "To the Virgins, to Make Much of Time" (Robert Herrick)
 "The Passionate Shepherd to His Love" (Christopher Marlowe)
 "Why So Pale and Wan, Fond Lover?" (Sir John Suckling)
 "It Was a Lover and His Lass" (William Shakespeare)
 "The Constant Lover" (Sir John Suckling)
 "Song to Celia" (Ben Johnson, adapted by P.D.Q. Bach)
 "Interlude" (piano alone)
 "Farewell, Ungrateful Traitor" (John Dryden)
 "Who Is Sylvia?" (William Shakespeare)
Twelve Quite Heavenly Songs (Aire Proprio Zodicale), S. 16°
  "Gemini" ("Now Diddle had a twin")
 "Cancer" ("Henry the Crab")
 "Leo" ("Now Leo the Lion")
 "Virgo" ("Virginia, fairest Virginia")
 "Libra" ("Scales are very handy")
 "Scorpio" ("When the Lord was handing weapons out")
 "Sagittarius" ("Come all ye lads and lasses")
 "Capricorn" ("When William the Conqueror was a child")
 "Aquarius" ("Water bearer")
 "Pisces" ("O holy mackerel")
 "Aries" ("Once there was a sheep")
 "Taurus" ("Can you lend me twenty quid?")

Sources
 P.D.Q. Bach: Liebeslieder Polkas

P. D. Q. Bach albums
1980 albums
1980s comedy albums
Vanguard Records albums